Mascarenichthys heemstrai is a ray-finned fish species from the family of Bythitidae in the genus of Mascarenichthys. The scientific name of the species was first published in 2007 by Schwarzhans & Møller, It was named after Phil Heemstra, a notable ichthyologist.

References 

Bythitidae
Fish described in 2007